Sergio Andrés Higuita García (born 1 August 1997) is a Colombian professional road racing cyclist, who currently rides for UCI WorldTeam .

Career
He moved to EF Education First from UCI Continental team  in May 2019, having initially been set to join in the summer. In August 2019, he was named in the startlist for the 2019 Vuelta a España. In early 2020 he finished 3rd in Paris-Nice and won the best young rider jersey. In August 2020, he was named in the startlist for the 2020 Tour de France. He did not finish the Tour but the following year he placed 25th overall. 

Higuita moved to Bora–Hansgrohe for the 2022 season. On stage 6 of the 2022 Volta a Catalunya he went on a long distance attack with Richard Carapaz. The pair stayed away for over 100 kilometers and Higuita moved into the leader's jersey. He defended his position on the final stage in Barcelona and also won the Mountains and Best Young Rider classifications.

Major results

2016
 9th Overall Tour de Gironde
 10th Prueba Villafranca de Ordizia
2017
 1st  Mountains classification, Vuelta a Asturias
2018
 9th Klasika Primavera
 9th Overall Vuelta a Castilla y León
 9th Overall Tour of China I
1st  Mountains classification
2019
 Vuelta a España
1st Stage 18
 Combativity award Stage 18
 1st  Young rider classification, Volta a la Comunitat Valenciana
 2nd Overall Tour of California
 3rd Giro dell'Emilia
 3rd GP Miguel Induráin
 4th Overall Tour de Pologne
 4th Road race, UCI Road World Under-23 Championships
 4th Klasika Primavera
 4th Trofeo Serra de Tramuntana
 5th Overall Volta ao Alentejo
1st Stage 4
 5th Tre Valli Varesine
 6th Trofeo Campos, Porreres, Felanitx, Ses Salines
 7th Overall Vuelta a Andalucía
2020
 1st  Road race, National Road Championships
 1st  Overall Tour Colombia
1st  Young rider classification
1st Stages 1 (TTT) & 4
 3rd Overall Paris–Nice
1st  Young rider classification
2021
 6th Tre Valli Varesine
 9th Giro della Toscana
 10th Giro di Lombardia
2022
 1st  Road race, National Road Championships
 1st  Overall Volta a Catalunya
1st  Mountains classification
1st  Young rider classification
 1st Stage 4 Tour de Romandie
 1st Stage 5 Volta ao Algarve
 2nd Overall Tour de Suisse
1st  Young rider classification
 2nd Tre Valli Varesine
 4th Giro di Lombardia
 5th Liège–Bastogne–Liège
 8th Overall Tour de Pologne
1st Stage 3
 10th Strade Bianche
2023
 3rd Overall Vuelta a San Juan

General classification results timeline

Monuments results timeline

References

External links

1997 births
Living people
Colombian male cyclists
Colombian Vuelta a España stage winners
Sportspeople from Medellín
Olympic cyclists of Colombia
Cyclists at the 2020 Summer Olympics
21st-century Colombian people